Steinway Street is a major street in the borough of Queens in New York City, New York, in the United States. Steinway Street is a 2.4 mile two-way street that runs north-south between Berrian Boulevard in Astoria and Northern Boulevard in Long Island City. South of the Grand Central Parkway, Steinway Street is a major commercial district that is the primary section of a Business improvement district called Steinway Astoria Partnership.

Richard Hellmann, creator of Hellmann's mayonnaise, had his first big factory at 495 / 497 Steinway Street from 1915 to 1922. In 1922, operations moved to a larger factory at 34-08 Northern Boulevard.

Steinway Street is accessible by subway at the subway station of the same name. The Q101 bus travels along Steinway Street from 20th Avenue to Northern Boulevard.

References

Streets in Queens, New York
Steinway & Sons